Eleanor Warren may refer to:

 Eleanor Clark (1913–1996), American writer who married Robert Penn Warren
 Eleanor Warren (cellist) (1919–2005), British cellist and music producer

See also
 Elinor Remick Warren (1900–1991), American composer of